Gerald McNee is a Scottish football journalist, who made his name in the Scottish football press with the Scottish Daily Express and Daily Star in the 1970s. He was also a match commentator from 1974 to 2004. McNee also wrote several books about Celtic. He was nicknamed 'The voice of football' by Scotsport, for whom he commentated, and 'The Voice of a football' by many fans.

McNee also wrote In the Footsteps of the Quiet Man: The Inside Story of the Cult Film, a book about the film The Quiet Man. The book is described as "a revealing and touching account of when Hollywood came to beautiful Connemara in the West of Ireland."

While a sports writer with the Daily Star, McNee had a dispute with Celtic manager Billy McNeill.

McNee retired from broadcasting at the end of the 2003–04 season.

Works 

 And You'll Never Walk Alone 1972, 
 A Million Miles for Celtic - An Autobiography Stanley Paul, 1982, 
 In the Footsteps of the Quiet Man: The Inside Story of the Cult Film Mainstream Publishing, 2008, 
 A Lifetime in Paradise: The Jimmy McGrory Story Irnwurks Media, 2013

References 

Scottish association football commentators
Scottish sportswriters
Year of birth missing (living people)
Living people
Place of birth missing (living people)